This is a list of ecoregions in Bangladesh.

Terrestrial
Bangladesh is in the Indomalayan realm. Ecoregions are listed by biome.

Tropical and subtropical moist broadleaf forests
 Brahmaputra Valley semi-evergreen forests
 Lower Gangetic Plains moist deciduous forests
 Meghalaya subtropical forests
 Mizoram–Manipur–Kachin rain forests
 Sundarbans freshwater swamp forests

Tropical and subtropical grasslands, savannas and shrublands
 Terai-Duar savanna and grasslands

Mangroves
 Myanmar Coast mangroves
 Sundarbans mangroves

Freshwater
 Ganges Delta & Plain
 Chin Hills - Arakan Coast

Marine
Bangladesh's coastal waters are in the Western Indo-Pacific marine realm.
 Northern Bay of Bengal

References

 
Bangladesh
Ecoregions